Feick is a German surname. Notable people with the surname include:

Arne Feick (born 1988), German footballer
George Feick (1849–1932), German-American builder
Jamie Feick (born 1974), American basketball player
Otto Feick (1890–1959), German inventor and gymnast

See also
Feick Building in Ohio, United States

German-language surnames